The Horse (⾺) is the seventh of the 12-year cycle of animals which appear in the Chinese zodiac related to the Chinese calendar. There is a long tradition of the Horse in Chinese mythology. Certain characteristics of the Horse nature are supposed to be typical of or to be associated with either a year of the Horse and its events, or in regard to the personality of someone born in such a year. Horse aspects can also enter by other chronomantic factors or measures, such as hourly. The year of the horse is associated with the Earthly Branch symbol 午.

History 
The lunar calendar paved the sequence of the Chinese zodiac animals. This calendar can be traced back to the 14th century B.C. Myths say that Emperor Huangdi, the first Chinese emperor, in 2637 B.C. invented the Chinese lunar calendar, which follows the cycles of the moon. In a folklore story that explains the origins of the cycle, the animals hold a race to determine their order. The custom of pairing an animal with a year in a 12-year cycle can be traced back to at least the Han dynasty (201 BC – 220 AD), and there are many legends and folktales surrounding the 12 zodiac animals, which are often depicted in East Asian art and design. A group of Chinese figures in our collection shows the zodiac animals with human bodies but animal heads. This way of portraying them became popular in the Tang dynasty (8th century).

Other Countries 
The use of animals to mark the years originated in China and spread throughout East and Central Asia. Some animals were adapted in line with local species – for example, the central Asian Turkic peoples replaced tiger with leopard, pig with elephant, and rat with camel. Vietnam uses a water buffalo instead of an ox, and a cat instead of a rabbit. Variations of the zodiac animals remain popular across East Asia and Southeast Asia, as countries such as Japan, South Korea, Vietnam, Cambodia and Thailand all celebrate the Lunar New Year. New Year's decorations often feature that year's animal, and the zodiac animals feature abundantly in art and design from these regions.

Personalities 
Men born in the year of the horse are independent and have a craving for freedom. They are easy going and treat everyone sincerely. They also often overestimate themselves. Even if they know what their faults are, it’s hard for them to change. Women born in the Horse year are beautiful and have a refreshing aura. Sometimes they are gentle ponies, other times they can become wild stallions. Regardless, they are impressive and good at what they do. Motivation and help from others are not important. As long as they’re doing what they like, they will succeed. They can be chatterboxes and have a clear division between like and dislike. However, they are usually indecisive. Rather than having a clear plan, they leave things to fate. People with the horse zodiac loves jobs that are constantly changing. Rather than a simple and routine job, Horses are more suitable for technical and effective work. Some examples include journalism, sales and translating. This makes strong candidates as politicians and critics.

Years and the Five Elements

People born within these date ranges can be said to have been born in the "Year of the Horse", while also bearing the following elemental sign:

Basic astrology elements

See also
 Burmese zodiac
 Chinese astrology
 Chinese New Year
 Horse
 Horse worship

Notes

References
Hale, Gill (2002). The Practical Encyclopedia of Feng Shui. New York: Barnes and Noble Books. 
Luke, Learie. 2007. Identity and secession in the Caribbean: Tobago versus Trinidad, 1889–1980.
This is a book published by a university press, so it should be a reliable source. It also covers the topic in some depth, so it's helpful in establishing notability.
 Galeano, Gloria; Bernal, Rodrigo (2013-11-08). "Sabinaria , a new genus of palms (Cryosophileae, Coryphoideae, Arecaceae) from the Colombia-Panama border". Phytotaxa.
 This is a peer-reviewed scientific journal, so it should be a reliable source. It covers the topic in some depth, so it's helpful in establishing notability.
 Baker, William J.; Dransfield, John (2016). "Beyond Genera Palmarum: progress and prospects in palm systematics". Botanical Journal of the Linnean Society.
 This is a peer-reviewed scientific journal, so it should be a reliable source for a specific fact. Since it only dedicates a few sentences to the topic, it can't be used to establish notability.
 “V&A · The Lunar Zodiac.” Victoria and Albert Museum, https://www.vam.ac.uk/articles/the-lunar-zodiac#slideshow=8683334511&slide=0.
 “Chinese Zodiac: Cultural Significance.” Chinese Zodiac | Cultural Significance, https://depts.washington.edu/triolive/quest/2007/TTQ07030/culture.html.
 Chiao, Fefe Ho & Chloe, et al. “Year of the Horse: Fortune and Personality – Chinese Zodiac.” Chinese New Year, https://chinesenewyear.net/zodiac/horse/.

External links

Chinese astrological signs
Vietnamese astrological signs
Horses in mythology
Horses in Chinese mythology